Xanthorrhoea pumilio is a species of grasstree of the genus Xanthorrhoea native to Queensland.

It blooms between April and May producing cream-white flowers.

The species is found along the east coast of Queensland from Cooktown south to Gladstone and as afar west as the Great Dividing Range.

References

Asparagales of Australia
pumilio
Flora of Queensland
Plants described in 1810
Taxa named by Robert Brown (botanist, born 1773)